The China Times Eagles is a defunct professional baseball team belonging to the Chinese Professional Baseball League (CPBL) that existed between 1993 and 1997.

History
Originally formed as an amateur club Black Eagles in 1990, this club was purchased by the China Times Corporation in November 1991 and professionalized in 1992 after absorbing a group of players from the Chinese Taipei national baseball team who just won silver medal in the 1992 Summer Olympics, like its sister team Jungo Bears. This club took Kaohsiung Li De Baseball Stadium (Chengching Lake Baseball Field was not built at that time) and Pingtung Baseball Field as its home throughout its history.

Regular Season Records

Playoff Records

Taiwan Series

Notable former players
 Robinson Checo
 Liao Ming-Hsiung
 Ravelo Manzanillo
 Pascual Pérez

See also
 The Black Eagles Incident

References
 The China Times

Baseball teams established in 1993
Baseball teams disestablished in 1997
Defunct baseball teams in Taiwan
1993 establishments in Taiwan
1997 disestablishments in Taiwan